"Love in Store" is a song by British-American rock group Fleetwood Mac. The song is the opening track on the 1982 album Mirage, the fourth album by the band with Lindsey Buckingham acting as main producer with Richard Dashut and Ken Caillat. "Love in Store" was written by Christine McVie and Jim Recor and it became the album's third single in the US. Released in November 1982, it went on to peak at No. 22 for three weeks as the follow-up to Top 20 hits "Hold Me" (No. 4) and "Gypsy" (No. 12). It also peaked at #11 on the Adult Contemporary chart. The song features lead vocals by Christine McVie with prominent vocal harmonies by Stevie Nicks and background vocals by Lindsey Buckingham.

Billboard said that "has the same appeal as the string of singles that first gave the group ownership of the pop charts in 1975–1976."

In the UK, another track from Mirage, "Oh Diane", was released as the third single instead and was a Top 10 hit. "Love In Store" was not released as a single in the UK, although it was released in some European territories.

The song is included on the 2002 US version, and 2009 UK re-issue of the album The Very Best of Fleetwood Mac. An alternative mix of the song was released in 1992 on the CD box set 25 Years – The Chain.

Personnel
Christine McVie – electric piano, electronic organ, lead vocals, backing vocals
Lindsey Buckingham – electric guitar, acoustic guitar, backing vocals
Stevie Nicks – backing vocals
John McVie – bass guitar
Mick Fleetwood – drums, tambourine, güiro, wood block, xylophone

Chart performance

References

Bibliography
The Great Rock Discography. Martin C. Strong. p. 378, Canongate Books, .

External links
Official Charts Company.com. UK chart information
Official website

1982 singles
Fleetwood Mac songs
Songs written by Christine McVie
Song recordings produced by Ken Caillat
Song recordings produced by Richard Dashut
1982 songs
Warner Records singles